

109001–109100 

|-id=097
| 109097 Hamuy ||  || Mario Hamuy (born 1960), Professor of Astronomy at the University of Chile || 
|}

109101–109200 

|-bgcolor=#f2f2f2
| colspan=4 align=center | 
|}

109201–109300 

|-bgcolor=#f2f2f2
| colspan=4 align=center | 
|}

109301–109400 

|-id=330
| 109330 Clemente ||  || Roberto Clemente (1934–1972) was a Puerto Rican professional baseball player who played 18 seasons for the Pittsburgh Pirates. He died in a plane crash attempting to deliver supplies to earthquake victims in Managua, Nicaragua. He was the first Latin American player enshrined in the Hall of Fame. || 
|}

109401–109500 

|-id=435
| 109435 Giraud ||  || Jean Giraud (1938–2012) was a French artist, cartoonist, and writer. Using an abstract and often surreal style, he produced a wide range of science fiction and fantasy works. He also contributed storyboards and concept designs to films such as Alien, The Fifth Element, Heavy Metal, the Abyss and Tron. || 
|}

109501–109600 

|-id=573
| 109573 Mishasmirnov ||  || Mikhail Alexandrovich Smirnov (1954–2006) was a Russian astronomer who researched small Solar System bodies, artificial satellites and the evolution of galaxies. He was on the staff of the Institute of Astronomy of the Russian Academy of Sciences and also popularized astronomy in Russia. || 
|}

109601–109700 

|-bgcolor=#f2f2f2
| colspan=4 align=center | 
|}

109701–109800 

|-id=712
| 109712 Giger ||  || H. R. Giger (1940–2014), a Swiss painter, sculptor, set designer and film director. His themes included science fiction, the occult, and fantasy. He was part of a team that won an Academy Award for Best Achievement in Visual Effects for its work on the film Alien. || 
|}

109801–109900 

|-id=879
| 109879 Letelier || 2001 SL || Patricio Letelier (1943–2011), a Chilean mathematician and physicist whose work contributed to general relativity, concerning black holes, chaos, topological defects, and exact solutions of the Einstein field equations || 
|}

109901–110000 

|-bgcolor=#f2f2f2
| colspan=4 align=center | 
|}

References 

109001-110000